Trabucco Cliff is a cliff at the tip of the broad spur which forms the northeast extremity of Mount Rees in the Crary Mountains. Mapped by United States Geological Survey (USGS) from surveys and U.S. Navy aerial photography, 1959–66. Named by Advisory Committee on Antarctic Names (US-ACAN) for William J. Trabucco, United States Antarctic Research Program (USARP) ionospheric physicist at McMurdo Station, 1969, and Siple Station, 1973.

References 

Cliffs of Marie Byrd Land
Crary Mountains